White Violet is an indie rock band from Athens, Georgia, composed of Vaughan Lamb, Brad Morgan, Lemuel Hayes, and Nate Nelson. They released their debut album, Hiding, Mingling, in August 2012 with Normal Town Records.

Discography 
Hiding, Mingling (2012)

References

External links 
 Official Website
 @_WhiteViolet_ on Twitter
 White Violet on Facebook
 Prefixmag.com Hiding, Mingling Review

Indie rock musical groups from Georgia (U.S. state)
Musical groups from Athens, Georgia